Oedipus is a tragedy by the French dramatist and philosopher Voltaire that was first performed in 1718. It was his first play and the first literary work for which he used the pen-name Voltaire (his real name was François-Marie Arouet).

Composition
Voltaire completed the play in 1717 during his 11-month imprisonment. In a letter of 1731 Voltaire wrote that when he wrote the play he was "full of my readings of the ancient authors [...] I knew very little of the theater in Paris." In adapting Sophocles' Athenian tragedy Oedipus Rex, Voltaire attempted to rationalise the plot and motivation of its characters. In a letter of 1719 he indicated that he found it improbable that the murder of Laius had not been investigated earlier and that Oedipus should take so long to understand the oracle's clear pronouncement. Voltaire adds a subplot concerning the love of Philoctète for Jocaste. He also reduces the prominence of the theme of incest.

Critical reception
Oedipe premièred on 18 November 1718 at the Comédie-Française, during his first period of exile at Châtenay-Malabry. Quinault-Dufresne played Oedipus, and Charlotte Desmares, Jocaste. The  Régent was present at the première and congratulated Voltaire for his success. The Regent was long rumored to have an incestuous relation with his elder daughter, Marie Louise Élisabeth d'Orléans, Duchess of Berry. Voltaire had been arrested and sent to the Bastille in May 1717 after telling a police informer that the Duchess was pregnant and secluding herself in her castle of La Muette pending her delivery. Rumors of Philippe's incestuous relationship with his daughter had made Arouet's play controversial long before it was performed. The première was also attended by the Duchess of Berry who entered in royal style escorted by the ladies of her court and her own guards. Rumored to be in the family way again, the Regent's daughter could no longer conceal her state and her very visible pregnancy inspired the satirists' malicious comments that spectators would not only see Oedipus (the Regent) and Jocaste (Berry) but maybe witness also the birth of Eteocles. The presence of the ill-reputed princess thus contributed to the public success of the play The production ran for 45 performances and received great critical acclaim that marked the start of Voltaire's success in his theatrical career. It constituted "the greatest dramatic success of eighteenth century France". It was revived on 7 May 1723 with Le Couvreur and Quinault-Dufresne and remained in the répertoire of Comédie-Française until 1852.

References

Sources
 Banham, Martin, ed. 1998. The Cambridge Guide to Theatre. Cambridge: Cambridge UP. .
 Burian, Peter. 1997. "Tragedy Adapted for Stages and Screens: the Renaissance to the Present." The Cambridge Companion to Greek Tragedy. Ed. P. E. Easterling. Cambridge Companions to Literature ser. Cambridge: Cambridge UP. 228–283. .
 Vernant, Jean-Pierre, and Pierre Vidal-Naquet. 1988. Myth and Tragedy in Ancient Greece. Trans. Janet Lloyd. New York: Zone Books, 1990. . Trans. of Mythe et Tragédie en Grèce Ancienne (Librarie François Maspero, 1972) and Mythe et Tragédie en Grèce Ancienne Deux (Editions La Découverte, 1986).

External links 
List of productions on CÉSAR
 Full text (French) of Oedipe on Wikisource
 Literature on Oedipe, Société des Etudes Voltairiennes

1718 plays
Incest in plays
Plays by Voltaire
Plays based on ancient Greek and Roman plays
Plays set in ancient Greece
Works based on Oedipus Rex
Tragedy plays
Plays based on works by Sophocles
Plays based on classical mythology